Oculariini is a tribe of longhorn beetles of the subfamily Lamiinae. It was described by Karl Jordan in 1894. It contains a single genus, Ocularia.

subgenus Jossocularia
 Ocularia abyssinica Téocchi, Jiroux & Sudre, Jiroux & Sudre, 2004
 Ocularia undulatofasciata Lepesme & Breuning, 1952

subgenus Ocularia
 Ocularia albolineata Villiers, 1942
 Ocularia anterufa Breuning, 1964
 Ocularia apicalis Jordan, 1894
 Ocularia ashantica Breuning, 1950
 Ocularia aurescens Breuning, 1964
 Ocularia brunnea Jordan, 1894
 Ocularia cineracea Jordan, 1894
 Ocularia collarti Breuning, 1950
 Ocularia decellei Breuning, 1968
 Ocularia fasciata Aurivillius, 1907
 Ocularia flavovittata Breuning, 1940
 Ocularia grisea Breuning, 1958
 Ocularia grisescens Breuning, 1940
 Ocularia insularis Breuning, 1960
 Ocularia juheli Téocchi, Jiroux & Sudre, 2004
 Ocularia kaszabi Breuning, 1972
 Ocularia marmorata Breuning, 1950
 Ocularia mirei Breuning, 1977
 Ocularia nigrobasalis Breuning, 1950
 Ocularia pantosi Breuning, 1957
 Ocularia pointeli Lepesme & Breuning, 1955
 Ocularia protati Lepesme & Breuning, 1955
 Ocularia quadroalbovittipennis Breuning, 1960
 Ocularia quentini Breuning, 1960
 Ocularia rotundipennis Breuning, 1950
 Ocularia subashantica Breuning, 1956
 Ocularia subcineracea Breuning, 1968
 Ocularia transversefasciata Breuning, 1940
 Ocularia undulatovittata Breuning, 1967
 Ocularia vittata Aurivillius, 1907
 Ocularia vittipennis Breuning, 1960

References

Lamiinae
Taxa named by Stephan von Breuning (entomologist)